Chocnějovice is a municipality and village in Mladá Boleslav District in the Central Bohemian Region of the Czech Republic. It has a population of about 400.

Administrative parts
Villages and hamlets of Buda, Buřínsko 1.díl, Buřínsko 2.díl, Drahotice, Ouč, Rostkov and Sovenice are administrative parts of Chocnějovice.

Notable people
Miloslav Rechcigl Sr. (1904–1973), politician

References

Villages in Mladá Boleslav District